"For the Moment" is a song by the Japanese J-pop group Every Little Thing, released as their fourth single on June 4, 1997. It was their first single to top the Oricon chart.

Track listing
 For the Moment (Words & music - Mitsuru Igarashi) 
 For the Moment (remix 7.00)
 For the Moment (instrumental)

Chart positions

References

External links
 For the Moment information at Avex Network.
 For the Moment information at Oricon.

1997 singles
Every Little Thing (band) songs
Oricon Weekly number-one singles
Songs written by Mitsuru Igarashi
1997 songs
Avex Trax singles